Events from the year 1893 in Denmark.

Incumbents
 Monarch – Christian IX
 Prime minister – J. B. S. Estrup

Events

Sports
 19 May  B 93 is founded.

Births
 26 January – Christian Arhoff, actor (died 1973)
 14 February – Kay Fisker, architect (died 1965)
 26 May – Vilhelm Lundstrøm, painter (died 1950)
 12 June – Helga Frier, actress (died 1972)
 24 July – C. Th. Sørensen, landscape architect (died 1979)
 28 July – Rued Langgaard, composer and organist (died 1952)
 4 August – Tom Kristensen, poet and critic (died 1974)
 25 December – Prince Viggo, Count of Rosenborg (died 1970)

Deaths
 10 June – Erhardine Adolphine Hansen, actress (born 1815)
 7 September – Israel B. Melchior, photographer (born 1827)
 13 September – Carl Ludvig Gerlach, composer and opera singer (born 1832)
 19 September  – Anker Heegaard, businessman (born 1815)

References

 
1890s in Denmark
Denmark
Years of the 19th century in Denmark